Mike Heller (born January 17, 1982) is an American drummer known as a member of the industrial metal group Fear Factory, the technical death metal band Malignancy, the British heavy metal band Raven, and rock band The Lucid alongside bassist David Ellefson (ex Megadeth), guitarist Drew Fortier, and vocalist Vinnie Dombroski (Sponge). Heller also formed the band System Divide and is a session drummer with credits in many genres.

Biography 
Heller traces his musical and drumming influences across many genres, including gospel, Latin jazz and funk. He has been known to incorporate these styles into his death metal compositions, although they can be difficult to recognize when played at death metal tempos. Heller teaches current and aspiring extreme metal drummers and writes columns for Sick Drummer magazine. He is known as a talented linear player, a style which involves the use of two or more limbs, with no two limbs playing the same thing at the same time. Heller plays session drums and has collaborated with artists in disparate styles. He joined the Yonkers, New York-based technical death metal band Malignancy in 2003, replacing Roger J. Beaujard. In 2008, he started the band System Divide with the Aborted vocalist Sven de Caluwé and the ex-Distorted vocalist Miri Milman. Heller joined Fear Factory in 2012 after the departure of Gene Hoglan. Heller performed on the 2020 debut album by Amahiru, a musical project led by Frédéric Leclercq and Saki.

Discography 

Fear Factory
Genexus (2015)
Aggression Continuum (2021)
Malignancy
Inhuman Grotesqueries (2007)
Eugenics (2012)
Epilogue (2014)
Malignant Future EP (2016)
Intrauterine Cannibalism Re-Recording (2019)
Raven
Screaming Murder Death From Above: Live In Aalborg (2019)
Metal City (2020)
Abigail Williams
Walk Beyond the Dark (2019)
The Lucid
The Lucid (2021)
Saddle Up and Ride (2023)
Aerosol
Murmurations (2021)
Amahiru
Amahiru (2020)
Black Hole Deity
Lair of Xenolich (2021)
Ol Drake
Old Rake (2015)
Gorepunch
Give Em Hell (2015)
Control/Resist
Gods By Design (EP) (2014)
System Divide
The Collapse (EP) (2009)
The Conscious Sedation (2010)
Ephemera (2012)
Success Will Write Apocalypse Across the Sky
The Grand Partition, and the Abrogation of Idolatry (2009)
Secrets She Kept
Le Fin Absolue du Monde (2011)
Azure Emote
The Gravity of Impermanence (2013)
The Third Perspective (2020)
The Cosmos
Imbecile (2013)
In the Fire
The Living Horror Show (2020)
Beneath
Ephemeris (2017)
Excommunicated
Death Devout (2018)
Kalopsia
Death Starts the Horror (2011)
Amongst the Ruins (2012)
Zillah
Not All of Me Shall Die / Man Son of Swine (2011)
Sigh
Shiki (2022)

Heller has also recorded with bands and artists including Edei, Ryann, 208 Talks of Angels, Measure, Razorcult, Chikatillo, Pseudo Supremacy, Hollow, Death Dealer and Cryosaur.

References 

1982 births
American heavy metal drummers
American jazz drummers
Death metal musicians
Jazz fusion drummers
Jewish American musicians
Jewish heavy metal musicians
Living people
Musicians from Brooklyn
Fear Factory members
Jazz musicians from New York (state)
21st-century American drummers
Industrial metal musicians
21st-century American Jews